Callum Damian Peter Morton  (born 19 January 2000) is an English professional footballer who plays as a striker for Salford City.

Morton began his career with the youth team of Yeovil Town, before signing for West Bromwich Albion. Durring his four years with Albion, he had spells on loan at Braintree Town, Northampton Town, Lincoln City, Fleetwood Town, and Peterborough United. He returned to Fleetwood on a permanent contract in 2022, but left after six months to sign for Salford.

Career
Born in Torquay, England, Morton joined the youth academy of Yeovil Town in 2015 signing a two-year scholarship in February 2016. In January 2017, after scoring against them the previous month in Yeovil's 3–2 FA Youth Cup victory, Morton signed for West Bromwich Albion for an undisclosed fee. 

In January 2020, Morton joined Northampton Town on loan. In June 2020 he won the EFL League Two Play-offs with Northampton; he scored twice in the semi-final second leg against Cheltenham Town to help them overturn a 2–0 first leg deficit, and then scored once in the final as they defeated Exeter City 4–0.

On 4 September 2020, it was announced that Morton, alongside West Brom team mate Alex Palmer, had joined Lincoln City on loan for the season. He made his debut for Lincoln the next day, coming off the bench in the first round of the EFL Cup. In the following round he would score his first goal for Lincoln in a 5–0 win over Bradford City. On 25 September, it was announced that Morton had suffered a shoulder injury and would miss a number of games. On 3 November 2020, Lincoln stated that Morton's injury had not improved as much as hoped, and that surgery might be required. In January 2021 it was announced that his recovery was nearing its end and that it was hoped he would be available to play in February. He would return to action on 2 March 2021, coming off the bench against Fleetwood Town and scoring a goal.

He moved on loan to Fleetwood in July 2021. After scoring seven goals in twenty-two appearances in all competitions, Morton was recalled by West Brom on 8 January 2022. On 13 January, Morton joined Championship side Peterborough United on loan for the remainder of the 2021–22 season.

In June 2022 it was announced that he would return to Fleetwood on a permanent contract on 1 July, signing a three-year contract for an undisclosed transfer fee.

On 13 January 2023, Morton signed a two-and-a-half year contract with League Two side Salford City.

Career statistics

Honours
Northampton Town
EFL League Two play-offs: 2020
Individual
 EFL League Two Player of the Month: February 2020

References

2000 births
Living people
Sportspeople from Torquay
English footballers
Association football forwards
Yeovil Town F.C. players
West Bromwich Albion F.C. players
Braintree Town F.C. players
Northampton Town F.C. players
Lincoln City F.C. players
Fleetwood Town F.C. players
Peterborough United F.C. players
Salford City F.C. players
National League (English football) players
English Football League players